Free is singer-songwriter Gavin DeGraw's third album. The album was released on March 31, 2009. It was his final album for J Records.

To keep himself from overthinking the songs, DeGraw made Free in less than two weeks at the Brooklyn studio of his producer Camus Celli, who has worked with such artists as Tina Turner, David Byrne, Lana Wolf and Arto Lindsay. DeGraw and Celli have known each other since working together on an early version of DeGraw's 2003 major-label debut, Chariot. “I’ve been in the studio with several different producers so I already knew what I wanted,” DeGraw says. “This was my opportunity to be involved in the production and I knew Camus could get the sounds I was going for.”

The trust he had in Celli and the collaborative spirit of their partnership freed DeGraw to dig deep and tap into something he hadn't tapped into for a while. “This album reveals the honesty about my love of music,” he says. “It isn’t about the biggest, the strongest, or the loudest. It’s about simplicity in its purest form. It doesn’t sound like the big machine. It sounds like where you go to escape the big machine.”

Development

The album was recorded towards the end of 2008 and completed in January 2009 and released on March 31, 2009, less than a year after the release of his previous album.

Singles
The album's first single, "Stay", was leaked through the internet on March 11, 2009. The second single, "Dancing Shoes", was released later in 2009. The song "Glass" was featured on the 18th episode from the sixth season of the series One Tree Hill.

Critical reception

Critics were generally favorable of the album.  Giving the album three-out-of-four stars, USA Today said that "DeGraw's haunting, bluesy drawl sometimes overwhelms this earnest, soulful-ish material. But when the annoyances are gone...the balance is beautiful."  Chuck Arnold of People magazine also gave the album three-out-of-four stars and found that DeGraw "gets back to his soulful essence on this simple, stripped-down collection of early and new songs." Stephen Thomas Erlewine of Allmusic gave the album 3 out of 5 stars saying, "He could use at least one hook as big as "I Don't Wanna Be," but Free manages to flow easily and warmly, something that couldn't quite be said of the blue-eyed soul bluster of his first two albums."

Track listing
All songs written by Gavin DeGraw, except "Indian Summer" by Chris Whitley.
"Indian Summer" – 4:43
"Free" – 3:56
"Stay" – 3:33
"Mountains to Move" – 5:46
"Glass" – 3:53
"Lover Be Strong" – 4:28
"Dancing Shoes" – 3:46
"Waterfall" – 4:41
"Why Do the Men Stray?" – 3:05

Bonus tracks
iTunes exclusive bonus track
"Never the Same" – 4:19

Amazon.com exclusive bonus track
"Young Love" – 3:46 (outtake)

Pre-order bonus track
"Get Lost" – 4:06 (outtake)

Personnel
Musicians
Piano, synthesizers, vocals, acoustic guitar - Gavin DeGraw
Guitar - Audley Freed
Bass - Andy Hess
B3, Wurlitzer, Clavinet, ARP String Ensemble - George Lanks
Drums - Charley Drayton

Except on "Waterfall"
Vocals - Gavin DeGraw
Guitar, omnichord - Jack Petrucelli
Bass - Alvin Moody
Drums - Matt Flynn

Charts
Free entered the Billboard 200 at #19, selling 29,000 copies, whereas his previous album Gavin DeGraw debuted at #7 in May 2008, selling 66,000 copies. In its second week, Free dropped to #97, a drop of seventy-eight places.

References

External links
 

2009 albums
Gavin DeGraw albums
J Records albums